Adam Kennedy is a retired baseball player.

Adam Kennedy may also refer to 

Adam Kennedy (actor) (1922–1997), American actor, screenwriter, novelist, and painter
Adam Kennedy (American football) (born 1991), American football quarterback
Adam Kennedy (footballer) (born 1992), Australian rules footballer for the Greater Western Sydney Giants
Adam Kennedy (government official), former Trump White House staff member; see Executive appointments by Donald Trump
Adam Kennedy (programmer), Australian Perl programmer
Adam Kennedy (tennis) (born 1983), Australian tennis player